Several vessels have been named Mornington named for one or another Earl of Mornington, particularly Richard Wellesley, 1st Marquess Wellesley, 2nd Earl of Mornington (General Wellington). 

 , a British merchant vessel launched at Calcutta. She made three voyages under charter to the EIC. On the third French privateers twice captured her and Royal Navy vessels twice recaptured her. A fire destroyed her in 1815.
 , a sloop of 22 guns and 438 tons (bm), was launched by the Bombay Dockyard as an armed cruiser for the Bombay Marine. She was later sold at auction.

See also

Citations and references
Citations

References
 

Ship names